William Lipscomb (July 20, 1829 – 1908) was a figure of the American Restoration Movement and co-editor of the Gospel Advocate.

Life 
Lipscomb was born in Franklin County, Tennessee.

The Gospel Advocate was founded by Nashville-area Restoration Movement preacher Tolbert Fanning in 1855.  William Lipscomb, who was a student of Fanning, served as co-editor until the American Civil War forced them to suspend publication in 1861.  After the end of the Civil War, publication resumed in 1866 under the editorship of Fanning and William Lipscomb's younger brother David Lipscomb; Fanning soon retired and David Lipscomb became the sole editor.

Lipscomb is buried in Mount Olivet Cemetery in Nashville, Tennessee.

References

External links
William Lipscomb at therestorationmovement.com.

1829 births
1908 deaths
People from Franklin County, Tennessee
American members of the Churches of Christ
Restoration Movement
19th-century American clergy